Greene may refer to:

Places

United States
Greene, Indiana, an unincorporated community
Greene, Iowa, a city
Greene, Maine, a town
Greene (CDP), Maine, in the town of Greene
Greene (town), New York
Greene (village), New York, in the town of Greene
Greene, Rhode Island, a village and census-designated place
Greene County (disambiguation), 14 counties
Greene Township, Pennsylvania (disambiguation), seven townships
Greene Mountain - see List of mountains in Virginia
Greene Island (Rhode Island)
Camp Greene, a former United States Army facility in Charlotte, North Carolina

Canada
Greene Island (Lake Ontario), an island in Lake Ontario
Greene Island (Lake Huron), an island in Lake Huron

People

Greene C. Bronson (1789–1863), American lawyer and politician

Other uses
, a World War II destroyer
Greene Avenue (Montreal), Quebec, Canada
The Greene Town Center, also known as The Greene, a mixed-use, office, retail, dining and entertainment center in Beavercreek, Ohio
State Correctional Institution – Greene, a maximum security prison in Franklin Township, Greene County, Pennsylvania

See also
Greene and Greene, American architects
Greene Building, Rensselaer Polytechnic Institute
Greene House (disambiguation)
Green (disambiguation)
Greener (disambiguation)